Fuxingmen Station is an interchange station on Line 1 and Line 2 of the Beijing Subway. It is named for Fuxingmen, a former gate in Beijing's city wall. The station handles over 170,000 transfers between Lines 1 and 2 per day.

Station Layout 
Both the line 1 and 2 stations have underground island platforms.

Exits 
There are four exits, lettered A, B, C, and D. Exits A and C are accessible.

Gallery

References

Beijing Subway stations in Xicheng District
Railway stations in China opened in 1984